KLDS (1260 AM, "Radio Voz AM") is a radio station licensed to serve Falfurrias, Texas, United States. The station is owned by Bill Doerner, Valerie Smith, and Larry Roberts, through licensee Sportsradiocc LLC.

KLDS broadcasts a Spanish-language religious radio format to the Rio Grande Valley and surrounding counties.

The radio station began operations in 1953 broadcasting as KBLP with 500 watts of power, daytime-only, on a frequency of 1260 kHz under the ownership of Ben L. Parker.  In 1956, under new ownership, the station had its call sign changed to KPSO.  The station was assigned the KLDS call sign by the Federal Communications Commission on December 19, 1997.

References

External links

LDS
Radio stations established in 1953
Brooks County, Texas
LDS
1953 establishments in Texas